Sri Ranganayaka Swamy Temple popularly known as "Shi Rangapur Temple'' is an ancient Hindu temple of Ranganayaka Swamy. it is located in Shri Rangapur Village, Pebbair, Wanaparthy District, Telangana.

History 
Sri Ranganayaka is the oldest temple in Telangana and was built by Rajas of Wanaparthy Samsthanam in the 18th century.

Festivals 
The temple hosts multiple festivals per year:

Brahmotsavalu, Krishna worship festival

Jatara, 15-day holy pilgrimage

Transport 
Srirangapur is about 10 km from Pebber and 25 km from Wanaparthy, as well as 160 km from Hyderabad The nearest railway station is Gadwal station, which is about 40 km for passenger trains.

References 

Hindu temples in Telangana
Wanaparthy district
Tourist attractions in Telangana